No More Tears is the sixth studio album by English heavy metal vocalist Ozzy Osbourne. Released on 17 September 1991, the album charted at number 17 on the UK Albums Chart and number seven on the US Billboard 200 albums chart. No More Tears spawned four singles which reached the top ten of the US Hot Mainstream Rock Tracks chart, including the number two "Mama, I'm Coming Home", and the Grammy-winning track "I Don't Want to Change the World". Along with 1980's Blizzard of Ozz it is one of Osbourne's two best-selling solo albums in North America, having been certified quadruple platinum by the RIAA and double platinum by CRIA. It was Osbourne's final album to feature drummer Randy Castillo and longtime bassist and songwriter Bob Daisley.

Background 
Guitarist Zakk Wylde contributed songwriting to the album, while Motörhead bassist/vocalist Lemmy Kilmister wrote the lyrics for six songs; however, only four were used on the album. Although Mike Inez appeared in the album's videos and promotional tours, long-time Osbourne collaborator Bob Daisley plays bass on the entire album. Inez is credited as a writer for the title track; although he does not perform on the actual recording, the intro bass riff was composed by him.

The 2002 reissue of No More Tears featured two additional tracks entitled "Don't Blame Me" and "Party with the Animals". Both tracks had originally been released in 1991 as B-sides. The version of "Don't Blame Me" on the 2002 reissue contains a different set of lyrics than the original b-side. The original b-side version can be found on the single and the original Japanese pressing of the CD.

According to professional wrestler and Fozzy lead vocalist Chris Jericho, when asked about the title of the song "A.V.H.", Osbourne told him it stands for "Aston Villa Highway", an homage to the football team he and his Black Sabbath bandmates followed as young men growing up in Birmingham.

Reception

No More Tears received positive reviews from critics, and is considered to be one of Osbourne's best albums. Loudwire ranked the album #22 on their list of "Top 90 Hard Rock + Metal Albums of the '90s". Ultimate Classic Rock included No More Tears on their list "Top 100 '90s Rock Albums". They also considered it to be Osbourne's third best album, only behind his first two albums. Classic Rock also considered it to be Osbourne's third best album.

Track listing

30th Anniversary Expanded Edition

 The "30th Anniversary Edition" of "Hellraiser" features a mashup of vocals by Osbourne and Kilmister, the latter sourced from the Motörhead version of the song.

Personnel 
 Ozzy Osbourne – vocals
 Zakk Wylde – guitars
 Bob Daisley – bass
 John Sinclair – keyboards
 Randy Castillo – drums 
 Michael Inez – inspiration and musical direction (did not play on record) 

Production

 Duane Baron – producer, engineer
 John Purdell – producer, engineer
 Michael Bosley – engineer
 Michael Wagener – mixing
 Bob Ludwig – mastering
Matt Mahurin - cover photography 

2002 reissue information

 Bruce Dickinson – reissue executive producer
 Chris Athens – mastering at Sterling Sound

Charts

Album

Singles

Certifications

References

External links
 

Ozzy Osbourne albums
1991 albums
Albums produced by John Purdell
Albums produced by Duane Baron
Epic Records albums
Albums recorded at A&M Studios